Rønshoved High School is a folk high school in southern Denmark on the northern banks of Flensburg Firth. It was founded in 1921 by its first headmaster, Aage Møller, who was inspired by the Danish philosopher and pastor N. F. S. Grundtvig. The school is general in the sense that it is not specialized but it offers a wide variety of intellectual subjects (history, religion, philosophy, literature, psychology, etc.), creative subjects (music, arts, writing, etc.), languages (Danish, English, German, French, Latin, and Hebrew), and sports (volleyball, badminton, kayaking, mountain biking, etc.). The classes are open to foreigners as well as to Danish students.

The short courses (1–2 weeks) are only held in Danish, whereas the long courses are held in Danish and/or English.

The Danish minister of culture and ecclesiastical affairs since 2015, Bertel Haarder, was born and grew up at Rønshoved High School.

Headmasters since 1921 
 1921–1941 Aage Møller (1885–1978)
 1941–1967 Hans Haarder (1905–1990)
 1967–1979 Hans and Oscar Haarder
 1979–1987 Oscar Haarder (1932–2011)
 1987–1996 Laurits Kjær-Nielsen (1936–2009)
 1996–2001 Erik Lindsø (1954)
 2001–present Nina (1962) and Thue Kjærhus (1954)

Sources 
 Rønshoved Højskoles årsskrifter
 Fædre og arv, Et tilbageblik med bidrag til den nødvendige samtale om højskolens nutid og fremtid – Rønshoved Højskole 1921-1996, Rønshoved Højskole, 1996.
 Poul Engberg, Nordens højskoler – perspektiver og aktualiteter, Kirkeligt Samfunds forlag, 1948
 Erica Simon, Réveil national et culture populaire en Scandinavie, 1960

See also 
 Folk High School
 Nikolai Frederik Severin Grundtvig

References

External links 
 Official website
 Youtube : Rønshoved Højskole

Schools in Denmark
Educational institutions established in 1921
1921 establishments in Denmark
Folk high schools in Denmark